St. Luke's Episcopal Church is a historic church at Ocoee and Central Streets, NW in Cleveland, Tennessee, United States. It is one of the city's oldest buildings and the second oldest church building in Cleveland.

The Gothic Revival-style church building was built in 1873. It was dedicated to the memory of a 7-year-old girl, Nina Craigmiles, who died on October 18, 1871, when the buggy she was riding in was hit by a railroad switch engine.

The church building features stained glass windows, wooden arches with intricate carvings, and a 3-story bell tower that contains a bell that is rung nine times after the opening voluntary at the beginning of each service, three peals each in honour of The Father, The Son, and The Holy Ghost. In addition to the bell, an electric carillon that plays the Westminster Chimes on the quarter hours. The building was added to the National Register of Historic Places in 1982.

References

External links

 St. Luke's Episcopal Church website

19th-century Episcopal church buildings
Churches completed in 1873
Churches in Bradley County, Tennessee
Cleveland, Tennessee
Episcopal churches in Tennessee
Gothic Revival church buildings in Tennessee
Churches on the National Register of Historic Places in Tennessee
National Register of Historic Places in Bradley County, Tennessee
Individually listed contributing properties to historic districts on the National Register in Tennessee
1873 establishments in Tennessee